Charles, Charlie, Charley or Chuck Jones may refer to:

Arts and entertainment
 Chuck Jones (1912–2002), American animator, director, and producer
 Charles Jones (c. 1889–1942), American actor better known as Buck Jones
 Charles Jones (photographer) (1866–1959), gardener and photographer
 Charles Jones (composer) (1910–1997), Canadian composer
 Charles Hollis Jones (born 1945), American artist and furniture designer
 Charlie Jones (actor) (born 1996), EastEnders actor
 Charlie Jones (musician) (born 1965), British bass-guitarist
 Charlie Jones (singer) (born 1999), singer of Stereo Kicks
 Sir Charles Jones (born 1973), American blues and Southern soul singer

Politics, law, military
 Charles Alvin Jones (1887–1966), U.S. federal judge
 Charles E. Jones (judge) (1935–2018), chief justice of the Arizona Supreme Court, 2002–2005
 Charles W. Jones (1834–1897), U.S. Senator from Florida
 Charles Pinckney Jones (1845–1914), American politician in Virginia
 Charles G. Jones (1856–1911), American urban developer and politician
 Charles Jones (Victorian politician) (1828–1903), Australian politician
 Charles Jones (Australian politician) (1917–2003), Australian politician and government minister
 Charles Jones (Upper Canada politician) (1781–1840), Canadian merchant, politician
 Charles E. Jones (politician) (1881–1948), mayor of Vancouver
 Charles Jones (MP for Beaumaris), Welsh MP between 1624 and 1640
 Charles Jones, 5th Viscount Ranelagh (1761–1800), Irish peer and Royal Navy officer
 Sydney Jones (businessman) (Charles Sydney Jones, 1872–1947), English shipowner and Liberal Party politician
 Charles Phibbs Jones (1906–1988), British Army general
 J. Charles Jones (1937–2019), American civil rights leader and Student Nonviolent Coordinating Committee co-founder
 Charles Colcock Jones Jr. (1831–1893), Georgia politician, attorney, and author
 Charles M. Jones (politician) (1921–2002), Alaskan politician
 Chuck Jones (politician) (born 1971), American politician in the South Dakota Senate

Sports

American football
 Charles "Yogi" Jones (born 1961), American football player and coach
 Charles Jones (tight end) (born 1996), American football player
 Charlie Jones (American football, born 1972), American football wide receiver
 Charlie Jones (American football, born 1998), American football wide receiver

Association football
 Charlie Jones (footballer, born 1899) (1899–1966), Welsh international footballer
 Charlie Jones (footballer, born 1911) (1911–1985), Welsh-born footballer
 Charles Wilson Jones (footballer) (1914–1986), Welsh international football centre forward
 Charles Jones (footballer) (1888–?), English-born football outside left who played for Birmingham and Bristol Rovers

Baseball
 Bumpus Jones (Charles Leander Jones, 1870–1938), 1890s baseball pitcher
 Charley Jones (1852–1911), American baseball outfielder
 Charlie Jones (infielder) (1861–1922), baseball infielder
 Charlie Jones (outfielder) (1876–1947), baseball outfielder

Basketball
 Charles Jones (basketball, born 1957), "Gadget" Jones, American basketball player with Washington Bullets (1985–93) and Houston Rockets
 Charles Jones (basketball, born 1962), American basketball player with Phoenix Suns, Portland Trail Blazers and Washington Bullets (1988–89)
 Charles Jones (basketball, born 1975), American basketball player with Chicago Bulls and Los Angeles Clippers

Cricket
 Charles Jones (Australian cricketer) (1870–1957), Australian cricketer
 Charles Jones (Lancashire cricketer) (1853–1904), English cricketer
 Charles Jones (West Indian cricketer) (1902–1959), West Indian cricketer
 Ian Jones (sportsman, born 1934) (born Charles Ian Jones in 1934), English cricketer and field hockey player

Rugby union
 Charlie Jones (rugby union, born 1880) (1880–1908), South African rugby union international
 Charles Jones (rugby union, born 1893) (1893–1960), Wales international rugby union player

Other sports
 Charlie Jones (Australian footballer) (1888–1946), Australian rules footballer
 Ian Jones (sportsman, born 1934) (Charles Ian McMillan Jones), British Olympic field hockey player
 Charlie Jones (sportscaster) (1930–2008), American sports announcer
 Deacon Jones (athlete) (Charles Nicholas Jones, 1934–2007), American steeplechase runner

Other people
 Charles "Buffalo" Jones (1844–1919), American rancher and conservationist
 Charles Colcock Jones (1804–1863), Presbyterian clergyman, planter, and missionary to slaves
 Charles Edward Jones (1952–2001), American astronaut
 Charles Handfield Jones (1819–1890), English physician
 Charles Henry Jones (businessman) (1855–1933), American businessman and philanthropist
 Charles Henry Jones (editor) (1848–1913), American journalist, editor, and political figure
 Charles I. Jones, professor of economics at Stanford University
 Charles Jones (architect) (1830–1913), Ealing's first architect, engineer and surveyor
 Charles Jones (engineer) (fl. 1773 – c. 1796), English civil engineer
 Charles Larimore Jones (1932–2006), U.S. Air Force architect
 Charles Lloyd Jones (1878–1958), Australian businessman and patron of the arts
 Charles O. Jones (born 1931), scholar of American politics
 Charles Pickman Jones (1808–1883), founded a ceramics factory in Seville
 Charles Price Jones (1865–1949), minister and composer
 Charles Stansfeld Jones (1886–1950), occultist and ceremonial magician
 Charles W. Jones (medievalist) (1905–1989), medievalist scholar
 Charles Irving Jones III (born 1943), Episcopal prelate
 Sir Charles Ernest Jones, British colonial civil servant
 Charlie Jones, Chief Shakes VII of the Tlingit people 1916–1944